The 2019 Florida State Seminoles women's soccer team represented Florida State University during the 2019 NCAA Division I women's soccer season. It was the 25th season of the university fielding a program. The Seminoles were led by 15th year head coach Mark Krikorian and entered the season as the defending national champions.

The Seminoles finished the season 18–6–0, 8–2–0 in ACC play, to finish in second place.  As the second seed in the ACC Tournament, they defeated Clemson in the first round before losing in overtime to Virginia in the semifinals.  They received an at-large bid to the NCAA Tournament where they defeated South Alabama, Brown, and USF, before losing to UCLA in the quarterfinals.

Squad

Roster

Team management 

Source:

Schedule

Source:

|-
!colspan=7 style=""| Non-Conference Regular season

|-
!colspan=7 style=""| ACC Regular season

|-
!colspan=7 style=""| ACC Tournament

|-
!colspan=7 style=""| NCAA Tournament

Rankings

References 

Florida State
Florida State Seminoles women's soccer seasons
2019 in sports in Florida